Jason Cousins (born 4 October 1970) is an English former footballer. He played eleven years with Wycombe Wanderers, from 1991 to 2002.

Playing career
Cousins graduated to the Brentford professional side in July 1989, making 21 Third Division appearances over the next two seasons.

In July 1991 he dropped into the Conference National to play for Martin O'Neill's Wycombe Wanderers. The club finished runners-up in his debut season, before they won the Conference and the FA Trophy in 1992–93. Back in the Football League, Cousins helped Wycombe to promotion to the Second Division in 1994 with their play-off final victory. This came despite his being stripped of the captaincy for a highly dangerous tackle on David Moss. He was voted the club's Player of the Season in 1994–95 and 1998–99. Remaining in the third tier for several years, he was a part of the club's remarkable FA Cup semi-final run in 2000–01, and played in the 2–1 defeat to Liverpool at Villa Park. In October 2002 he was given a testimonial match against Celtic, then managed by his former boss Martin O'Neill. Cousins made over 400 appearances for the club.

In June 2002, Cousins moved back to non-league football with Aldershot Town, where he spent one successful season as they were crowned Isthmian League Premier Division champions.

In June 2003, he moved on to Windsor & Eton, later moving on to Maidenhead United.

Honours
Wycombe Wanderers
Football League Second Division play-offs: 1994
Conference National: 1992–93
FA Trophy: 1992–93

Aldershot Town
Isthmian League Premier Division: 2002–03

Individual
 PFA Team of the Year: 1993–94 Third Division
Wycombe Wanderers Player of the Season: 1994–95, 1998–99

References

External links

1970 births
Living people
English footballers
Association football defenders
Brentford F.C. players
Wycombe Wanderers F.C. players
Aldershot Town F.C. players
Windsor & Eton F.C. players
Maidenhead United F.C. players
English Football League players
National League (English football) players